Lobogonia aculeata is a moth of the  family Geometridae. It is found in Taiwan.

The wingspan 20–24 mm.

References

Moths described in 1911
Larentiinae